Tze Chun (born Tze-ngo Chun ) is an American film and TV producer, director, writer, and comic book publisher. He was born in Chicago and raised outside of Boston, and graduated from Milton Academy in 1998. He received his bachelor's degree in film studies at Columbia University.

Films

Feature films

Children of Invention
His debut feature film, Children of Invention, premiered at the 2009 Sundance Film Festival, screened at over 50 film festivals, won 17 festival awards including 8 Grand Jury or Best Narrative Feature prize including "Best Narrative Feature" at the Newport International Film Festival, the Independent Film Festival Boston, the Los Angeles Asian Pacific Film Festival (where the cast won a Special Jury Prize in New Talent to Watch in Acting), the San Diego Asian Film Festival, and the San Francisco Asian American Film Festival, as well as "Emerging Filmmaker Awards" from the Hawaii International Film Festival and the DC Asian Pacific American Film Festival. The film was also released theatrically in 8 cities, on DVD, and on VOD in 2010.

The film was also praised by critics, with Manohla Dargis of The New York Times saying that the film was a "fine feature debut...while the politics are there, you might be too busy choking back tears to notice" and the Los Angeles Times also called it "wonderful...absorbing, deftly played", Variety called it "urgent, artful...austerely poetic" and USA Todays Claudia Puig said, "I loved this movie. I can't remember when I have loved a movie quite as much as this one."

Cold Comes the Night
In 2012, Chun wrapped principal photography on Cold Comes the Night (formerly "Eye of Winter"), which he co-wrote with Oz Perkins and Nick Simon. The film stars Bryan Cranston (Breaking Bad), Alice Eve (Star Trek Into Darkness), Logan Marshall-Green (Prometheus), Ursula Parker, and Leo Fitzpatrick. Frequent producer and collaborator Mynette Louie produced the film.

Short films

Chun has also directed numerous short films, including Windowbreaker, a selection of the 2007 Sundance Film Festival. Other short films directed by Chun include the World War II set Back to the Front (2006), Document (2006), about a writer whose girlfriend goes into a coma, Cold Feet, Wet Dreams, and the Kitchen Sink (2007), and a sci-fi short entitled Silver Sling (2010), set in a polarized economy of the near future where corporations offer subsidies to their high-ranking female employees to pay for chemically accelerated surrogate births.

Television work and writing

Cashmere Mafia 
Chun was also one of the staff writers for the ABC television series Cashmere Mafia, starring Lucy Liu. Chun was hired for the show based on his and writing partner Mike Weiss' original pilot, Getting in Good, a tongue-in-cheek drama set in the highly competitive world of Manhattan private school admissions. Chun also recently sold a spec pilot to The CW that Dan Jinks is currently producing.

Once Upon a Time 
Chun was a staff writer for the ABC television series Once Upon a Time (TV series). He wrote, alongside of Scott Nimerfro, episodes 11 Shattered Sight and 17 Heart of Gold (Once Upon a Time) of the Fourth Season, and Episodes 6 The Bear and the Bow (with Andrew Chambliss), 10 Broken Heart (Once Upon a Time) and 16 Our Decay (both with Diana Hogan) for Season Five.

Gotham 
Chun was the Executive Story Editor for Season Three of the FOX television series Gotham (TV series) and wrote episodes 8 Blood Rush and 18 Light the Wick.

Chun was the Co-Producer/Writer for Season Four of Gotham (TV series) and wrote episodes 5 The Blade's Path, 13 A Beautiful Darkness and 21 One Bad Day.

Chun was the Supervising Producer/Writer for Season Five of Gotham (TV series) and wrote three episodes Penguin, Our Hero, Ace Chemicals, and They Did What?.

Little America 
Chun was the Director/Writer for Season One episode 6 "The Grand Prize Expo Winners" of Apple TV+'s Little America (TV series), an American anthology television series.

Gremlins: Secrets of the Mogwai 
Chun is an executive producer and writer for Gremlins: Secrets of the Mogwai animated series at HBO Max.

I'm a Virgo 
Tze is an Executive Producer and Co-Showrunner of Boots Riley’s upcoming Amazon series "I'm a Virgo" staring Moonlight (2016)'s Jharrel Jerome. Riley wrote and directed the series. Tze serves as executive producer along with Michael Ellenberg and Jerome.

Comic work

Chun is a co-founder and publisher for TKO Studios, which was launched Dec 2018. George Gustines of The New York Times wrote that TKO Studios is "A New Comics Publisher Aims to Shake Things Up." Graeme McMillan of The Hollywood Reporter reported that "TKO Studios Plans to Change How Readers Buy Comics."

Accolades

In 2007, Chun was named one of the "25 New Faces of Independent Film" by Filmmaker Magazine.

In 2009, Chun received the Puma Emerging Filmmaker Award at the 2009 Hawaii International Film Festival and the George C. Lin Emerging Filmmaker Award at the DC Asian Pacific American Film Festival. He also received the "Visionary Award" from the Austin Asian American Film Festival.

In 2011, Chun was named as a United States Artists (USA) Fellow, specifically a USA Rockefeller fellow.

Visual art

Chun is also a painter and visual artist. He has commissioned private portraits in cities such as New York and Los Angeles, is represented by CVZContemporary Gallery in SoHo, and also painted the original artwork for the poster of the Oscar nominated feature film starring Ryan Gosling, Half Nelson directed by Ryan Fleck, as well as the children's book drawings that are also used in the film.

During Comic-Con 2010 in San Diego, it was announced that Will Eisner's groundbreaking graphic novel A Contract With God will be adapted into a feature film, with Chun directing one of the story's four chapters.

References

Further reading 
 6 Inspiring Filmmaking Lessons from Tze Chun by Rebecca Norris. Screencraft.org. Jan 2022.
 5 Screenwriting Tips from ‘Gremlins: Secrets of the Mogwai’ Creator Tze Chun by Julia Camara. wescreenplay.com. Jun 2021.
 Tze Chun reflects on the first year of TKO Studios. comicsbeat.com. Nov 2019.
 Interview with Tze Chun (Gotham, TKO Studios). Grawlix Podcast. Feb 2019.
 Interview: Tze Chun. Scott Myers. Go Into The Story, Jan 2014.
 Children of Invention director Tze Chun: The Media Diet. Spout Blog. Dec 2008.
 Fellows Interview. Film Independent. Oct 2008.
 Staying Power of Tze Chun. NewEnglandFilm.com. Dec 2008.

External links
 
 
 

American male screenwriters
American film directors of Chinese descent
American writers of Chinese descent
Writers from Boston
1980 births
Living people
Milton Academy alumni
Film directors from New York City
Screenwriters from New York (state)
Screenwriters from Massachusetts
Columbia College (New York) alumni